Dave Owen (born April 25, 1958) is a former professional baseball player who played as an infielder in Major League Baseball from -. He attended the University of Texas at Arlington and played for the Mavericks from 1977 to 1979.  After getting to the major leagues, he played for the Chicago Cubs and Kansas City Royals. He provided the game-winning RBI in the bottom of the 11th during the game in which Ryne Sandberg hit two home runs off Bruce Sutter on June 23, 1984. Owen's younger brother Spike played for five major league teams from 1983 to 1995.

Personal life
Owen and his wife Yasmin have two daughters, Haley and Courtney.

References

External links

1958 births
Living people
Baseball players from Texas
Chicago Cubs players
Chicago White Sox scouts
Gulf Coast Cubs players
Detroit Tigers scouts
Iowa Cubs players
Kansas City Royals players
Kansas City Royals coaches
Major League Baseball shortstops
Midland Cubs players
Nippon Professional Baseball coaches
Oklahoma City 89ers players
Omaha Royals players
Philadelphia Phillies scouts
Quad Cities Cubs players
UT Arlington Mavericks baseball players
People from Cleburne, Texas